Wonderland-Zona Preferente (also known as Wonderland Live (Zona Preferente)) is the first live album by Mexican-Argentine Latin pop band Eme 15. The album was recorded at the Auditorio Nacional in Mexico City on January 27, 2013.  
The album's first single, "Diferente", was recorded at the concert and released for digital download for iTunes in Mexico on April 9, 2013.

Production
Following the success of their debut album, Eme 15 in Mexico, the band announced plans to record a concert CD and DVD in October 2012. The album was recorded in front of a live audience on January 27, 2013 during one of two performances that day. New songs on the album include a duet by Paulina Goto and Natasha Dupeyrón called "Que Buena Suerte", as well as the song, "Magic Dragon" (featuring Antonio De Carlo), and the band's third official single, "Diferente".

Promotion
The album was released on April 30, 2013 in Mexico. It debuted on the Mexican Top 100 albums charts at number 6.

Track listing

Charts

Release history

References 

2013 live albums
Eme 15 albums
Spanish-language albums
Albums recorded at the Auditorio Nacional (Mexico)